Fileh Khasseh (also Romanized as Fīleh Khāşşeh, Filah Khāsah, and Fīlah Khāşeh; also known as Filakh-Khasakh, Fīleh Khāleşeh, and Peleh Khāseh) is a village in Zanjanrud-e Pain Rural District, Zanjanrud District, Zanjan County, Zanjan Province, Iran. At the 2006 census, its population was 104, in 23 families.

References 

Populated places in Zanjan County